Gordon Cavell Johnson (born March 28, 1985) is an American professional basketball player who last played for KW Titans of the NBL Canada. At a height of 2.05 m (6'8¾"), he plays at the power forward and center positions on the court. Johnson was named an NBL Canada All-Star in 2014, and won its Slam Dunk Contest the same season. He was often considered one of the top defenders in the league, having been named to two All-Defence Teams, and winning the NBL Canada Defensive Player of the Year Award. Johnson played college basketball at James Madison University, and the University of Maryland, Baltimore County.

On February 25, 2018, the KW Titans parted ways with coach Serge Langis and named Johnson new head coach, a position he held until 2021.

Early life 
Johnson was born on March 28, 1985, and raised in Fort Washington, Maryland, and Temple Hills, Maryland. In seventh grade, he dunked his first basketball. In an interview in 2008, he said that it was his most memorable moment as an athlete.

Collegiate career 
Johnson initially competed at the NCAA Division I level with the James Madison Dukes, but chose to transfer to UMBC after three seasons. He claimed that he was unhappy with his previous school and felt that he would see more immediate success with the Retrievers. One of Johnson's teammates also transferred to the same team with him, making the process smoother in his opinion.

Professional career
In 2011–2012, Johnson played with the Beltway Bombers in the American Professional Basketball League (ACPBL). The Bombers won the ACPBL championship and Johnson won the APBL Finals Most Valuable Player award.

In 2012–2013, Johnson joined the National Basketball League of Canada's (NBLC) Saint John Mill Rats. With the Mill Rats, he averaged 10.8 points, 6.0 rebounds, and 1.3 blocks per game.

Johnson then spent the next two years with the Brampton A's in the NBLC. In 2014, Johnson was selected to the All-NBLC Second Team after averaging 14.2 points, 6.2 rebounds and 1.5 blocks per game.  He also won the Defensive Player of the Year Award and was selected to participate in the NBLC All-Star Game. In 2015, Johnson averaged 12.4 points, 6.7 rebounds, and was tops in the league with 1.6 blocks per game. He was an All-NBL Canada Third Team member that season and helped the A's reach the NBLC Semi Finals.

On August 3, 2015, Johnson signed a one-year contract with Salon Vilpas Vikings of the Finish League.

On August 1, 2016, Johnson signed with Promitheas Patras of the Greek Basket League. He was officially released from the team on November 28, 2016, in order to attend to personal matters in the States. He then signed with KW Titans in the NBLC.

References

External links 
 Cavell Johnson at baskethotel.com (Greek League )
 Cavell Johnson at esake.gr (Greek League )
 Cavell Johnson at Eurobasket.com
 Cavell Johnson at slansportsmanagement.com
 Cavell Johnson at realgm.com
 James Madison College Bio

1985 births
Living people
American expatriate basketball people in Canada
American expatriate basketball people in Finland
American men's basketball players
Basketball coaches from Maryland
Basketball players from Maryland
Brampton A's players
Centers (basketball)
James Madison Dukes men's basketball players
KW Titans players
People from Fort Washington, Maryland
People from Temple Hills, Maryland
Power forwards (basketball)
Promitheas Patras B.C. players
Saint John Mill Rats players
Sportspeople from the Washington metropolitan area
UMBC Retrievers men's basketball players